The County of Merivale is a county located on the southern boundary of the state of Queensland, Australia. Like all counties in Queensland, it is a non-functional administrative unit, that is used mainly for the purpose of registering land titles.  The county was named in honour of Herman Merivale, the British permanent Under-Secretary of State for the Colonies. Its boundaries were declared and made subject to the Land Act 1897 on 7 March 1901. Population centres within the County of Merivale include the towns of Warwick, Allora and Killarney.

Parishes

See also
 Lands administrative divisions of Queensland

References

Merivale

External links